CLLD may refer to
 Cross-Linguistic Linked Data
 Community-led local development